The Laxford Bridge is a stone arch bridge in Sutherland, Scotland which carries the A838 across the River Laxford north to Rhiconich and Durness.

The bridge was built about 1834 by the Dukes of Sutherland – the road from Lairg, one of the "destitution roads" built during the potato famine, not being completed until 1851. The bridge is a category B listed building.

An army transporter crashed on the bridge in 2009 causing so much damage that it had to be closed to traffic.

References

Road bridges in Scotland
Listed bridges in Scotland
Category B listed buildings in Highland (council area)
Bridges completed in 1834
Bridges in Highland (council area)
Buildings and structures in Sutherland
1834 establishments in Scotland